Mindhunters is a 2004 crime slasher film directed by Renny Harlin and starring Kathryn Morris, LL Cool J, Jonny Lee Miller, Patricia Velásquez, Clifton Collins Jr., Christian Slater, and Val Kilmer. It was written by Wayne Kramer and Kevin Brodbin with an uncredited rewrite by Ehren Kruger. Unusually, the last country to receive this film was the United States in 2005, because of the film's distribution rights being changed from 20th Century Fox to Dimension Films.

Plot
The Mindhunters are a group of FBI trainee agents who are training as profilers. Their instructor, experienced profiler Jake Harris, employs a highly realistic training approach by assigning the group variants of real investigations, including elaborate sets, props, and FBI actors, to play out each scenario.

The student group is made up of Bobby, Vince, Nicole, Sara, Rafe, and Lucas. Alongside Harris is J.D., an experienced agent who leads the group and is secretly Nicole's lover too. Nearing the end of their training, the group's overall morale is high. However, Vince discovers that neither he nor Sara will make the rank of "profiler" after secretly reading their training evaluations.

The group travels with Harris and J.D. to a small island off the coast of North Carolina to complete their final training exercise. At the last minute, they are joined by Gabe, an outside observer who has requested to see Harris's teaching methods in action. The Navy uses the island to train for hostage rescue and outbreak scenarios, and it features an existing "population" of target dummies, vehicles on mechanical rails, and small-town storefronts. Similar to their earlier training scenarios, Harris plans on using the town for their final exam, tracking a serial killer calling himself, "The Puppeteer". The team settles down for the evening and practices their profiling skills, whereupon it is revealed that Gabe is also a skilled profiler in his own right. Sara and Lucas briefly bond over losses in their families. Sara's sister was murdered and drowned years previously, creating a persistent fear of water in Sara, while Lucas' parents died when he was 10. The two resolve to use the scenario to confront their personal fears.

The following morning, the group finds a dead cat with a broken pocket watch in its mouth. Later, during the initial investigation of the "puppeteer" scenario, J.D. dies after triggering a clock mechanism that causes a tank of liquid nitrogen (mislabeled as helium) to freeze him instantly. Realizing that J.D.'s death is neither accidental nor part of the training simulation, the group heads to the dock to leave the island, but the boat explodes before they can board. After returning to base, the group realizes that the broken watches and clocks found at each scene point to the fact that there's a real serial killer on the island, who has co-opted the training exercise and is now hunting them down. The killer's M.O. indicates that they plan to kill someone at a time designated by the broken clocks. After a thorough search of the island reveals nobody else present, the group concludes that the killer must be one of them.

Suspicions initially point to Gabe, as Lucas found maps and documents of the island in his luggage. However, as the group confront him, they all pass out as their coffee has been drugged. They awaken to discover the killer murdered Rafe while they were unconscious, draining his blood and leaving his severed head on a table, leading suspicions to return again to Gabe. Despite the suspicions, Gabe saves Vince from another trap involving broken water pipes and electrocution. Bobby is instead killed by a secondary trap when he goes to turn off the water. Sara deduces that the traps are based on their strengths, talents, and weaknesses, leading the remaining profilers to stick together. After more clues are discovered, suspicion shifts to Sara, who insists that she's being framed. Nicole leaves to be alone, but she becomes the next to die after she smokes a cigarette laced with acid.

Unexpectedly, the island's speakers broadcast a taunting message from Harris, making the group realize that he did not leave the island as he claimed. Convinced that Harris is the killer, Sara, Gabe and Lucas search for him, only to find Harris and two other FBI agents dead in a hidden storefront. Harris has been strung up to wires from the ceiling as a marionette, just like the fake "Puppeteer" crime scene they were to investigate. The three turn on each other after triggering another trap and Lucas is shot during the ensuing gun battle. Vince is trapped in a freezer after he tries to reload his empty gun, and soon dies when his gun backfires on him in the elevator.

Sara finds Vince's body, but Gabe ambushes her. The two struggle with each other, believing the other person is the killer. Gabe manages to overpower Sara but is then attacked by Lucas. Sara eventually recovers and hits Gabe over the head with a fire extinguisher. Lucas reveals that he had been wearing a bulletproof vest, allowing him to survive getting shot. With Gabe subdued, Lucas expresses doubt that there's enough evidence to prove that Gabe was the killer. Sara, however, reveals she found a way to get one step ahead of the killer. Knowing that the killer was relying on timed mechanisms and remotes, as well as enjoying watching their anxiety under pressure, she changed one of the clocks to appear slow by fifteen minutes, and covered it in a powder that glows phosphorescently under blacklight; reasoning that the killer wouldn't be able to resist setting the clock to the correct time, she grabs a black light to scan Gabe's hands and reveal him as the killer only to find the marking powder on Lucas' hands instead. Lucas confesses that his parents did not die in an accident, but that he killed them. Struggling to find more thrilling targets, he joined the FBI and planned to kill his brilliant fellow profilers, the only people he thought would be "worthy prey". Lucas tries to drown Sara, but she manages to kick him into the water. 

The two struggle again and recover their weapons underwater, though Sara manages to shoot Lucas dead before he can kill her. Gabe recovers from his earlier wound, and when morning arrives, Gabe and Sara flag down a U.S. Navy helicopter to leave the island.

Cast

 Kathryn Morris as Sara Moore
 LL Cool J as Gabe Jensen
 Jonny Lee Miller as Lucas Harper
 Patricia Velásquez as Nicole Willis
 Clifton Collins Jr. as Vince Sherman
 Eion Bailey as Bobby Whitman
 Will Kemp as Rafe Perry
 Val Kilmer as FBI Agent Jake Harris
 Christian Slater as J.D. Reston
 Trevor White as Attacker
 Cassandra Bell as Jen
 Jasmine Sendar as Jen's Friend
 Anthonie Kamerling as Man In bar
 Daniël Boissevain as Man In bar #2

Production
Wayne Kramer sold the original spec screenplay of Mindhunters to 20th Century Fox. The title of his screenplay was originally called Unsub (Unknown Subject), but Fox executives preferred the title Mindhunters and changed it before the deal was announced to the entertainment press. Kramer never felt comfortable with the title change because there was already a non-fiction book by John Douglas called Mindhunter.

Renny Harlin was originally attached to direct the film adaptation of A Sound of Thunder based on Ray Bradbury's short story, but left to helm this movie instead. Gerard Butler was set to the play the role of Lucas Harper, but dropped out to star in Timeline. Ryan Phillippe was also considered for the part, before Jonny Lee Miller eventually signed on. Phillippe's then-wife, Reese Witherspoon, was offered to play Sara Moore, but she turned it down and Kathryn Morris was later cast. Christopher Walken, Martin Sheen and Gary Busey were all offered the part of Jake Harris, but they rejected the film before Val Kilmer agreed to do the movie.

Mindhunters was filmed entirely in the Netherlands. Locations included Amsterdam (Amsterdam-Noord), The Hague, Delft, beach town Zandvoort, training village of the Police Academy in Ossendrecht and Radio Kootwijk on the Veluwe heath lands in the Gelderland province. Post-production of the film was moved to England to decrease the budget.  Filming and production went from January to September 2002, yet the film was not released until 2004 (2005 in the USA). During the editing process, Harlin toned down much of the violence, in order to secure a PG-13 rating in the United States, yet the MPAA felt that the overall tone of the film was too dark and still issued it an R; following this Harlin reinserted the deleted scenes.

Box office
The film was a box office letdown, making only $4,476,235 domestically against a production budget of $27 million.

Reception
Mindhunters received generally negative reviews and it currently holds a 24% rating on Rotten Tomatoes; the consensus states: "A retread of Ten Little Indians that lacks the source material's wit." On Metacritic, which uses an average of the critics' reviews, the film scored 33/100, indicating "generally unfavorable" reviews.

Roger Ebert, of the Chicago Sun-Times, gave Mindhunters 2½ stars. His comments were: "I will leave you with only one clue. In 'House of Wax', which opened last week, the movie theater is playing 'What Ever Happened to Baby Jane?'. In this movie, the theater marquee advertises 'The Third Man'. No, the male characters are not numbered in order, so you can't figure it out that way, nor is the killer necessarily a woman. So think real hard. What else do you know about 'The Third Man'? If you have never seen 'The Third Man', I urge you to rent it immediately, as a preparation (or substitute) for 'Mindhunters'."

References

External links
 
 
 
 
 

2004 films
2004 horror films
2004 crime thriller films
2004 psychological thriller films
2000s serial killer films
American action horror films
American crime thriller films
British crime thriller films
Dutch crime thriller films
Films set in North Carolina
Films set on uninhabited islands
Films shot in the Netherlands
Finnish thriller films
2000s English-language films
English-language Dutch films
English-language Finnish films
Films directed by Renny Harlin
American serial killer films
Dimension Films films
Films produced by Akiva Goldsman
Films scored by Tuomas Kantelinen
2000s American films
2000s British films